"Uproar" is a song by American rapper Lil Wayne. The song features intro vocals and production from American record producer Swizz Beatz. Young Money Entertainment and Republic Records released it to rhythmic and Urban radio on October 5, 2018, as the first single from Wayne's twelfth studio album, Tha Carter V. "Uproar" contains a sample of "Special Delivery", performed by G. Dep and P. Diddy.

Music video 
The song's music video was released on October 18, 2018.

Charts

Weekly charts

Year-end charts

Certifications

References

2018 singles
Lil Wayne songs
Songs written by Lil Wayne
Songs written by Swizz Beatz
Songs written by Holland–Dozier–Holland
2018 songs
Song recordings produced by Swizz Beatz